Ladybaby is a Japanese kawaii metal musical group, which originally consisted of aspiring photographic models Rie Kaneko (the only original member still in the group) and Rei Kuromiya, as well as Ladybeard, the bearded crossdressing persona of Australian male professional wrestler Richard Magarey.  On August 1, 2016, the group rebranded itself after Ladybeard's withdrawal from the group, going by "The Idol Formerly Known as Ladybaby", until they returned to the original Ladybaby moniker in 2018.

History 
Wrestler Richard Magarey, originally from Adelaide, Australia, moved to Hong Kong in 2006 to kickstart his martial arts stunt career in films, later becoming a hit in Hong Kong as a cross-dressing pro wrestler. In October 2013, he moved to Tokyo, Japan, to attempt a similar career there. He later formed the band with singers Rie Kaneko and Rei Kuromiya, and released their first track and music video titled "Nippon Manju", which is a song that covers all the things they love about Japan. Released in July 2015, the music video went viral on YouTube, at one point gathering 1 million views in 2 days.

Their second single, released in Japan on 13 January 2016, debuted at number 15 in the daily Oricon charts.

On August 1, 2016, the group re-branded itself after Ladybeard left, by changing the group's name to "The Idol Formerly Known as Ladybaby". The remaining members had a live concert on September 16, 2016 under the new branding. In 2017 they signed to JPU Records to release new single "Pelo" in Europe. They released another single, "Pinky! Pinky!", later that year. On 17 November 2017, Rei Kuromiya left the group, citing disillusionment with idol culture and throat problems caused by the extensive touring schedule. This led to the end of the band's time as "The Idol Formerly Known as Ladybaby.

In January 2018, the group announced a memorial compilation album entitled Beside U, to be released in Japan on 7 March 2018. The international release on CD from JPU Records included an exclusive booklet design with English lyric translations and Romaji lyric transliterations. In February that year, they began teasing a new lineup, with Rie Kaneko being joined by new members Nana Ikeda, Emily Arima and Fuka Karasawa, subsequently announcing a tour through Spring 2018 in a return to the original Ladybaby moniker. They released a music video for their comeback single "Hoshi no Nai Sora" on 10 May 2018, with the single being officially released on 30 May. Ladybeard announced a return to the group to appear on one of the B-sides for the single.

On October 29, 2019, it was announced that Ladybaby would suspend all activities on January 13, 2020, after their final show, with a compilation titled Reburn released the same day.

On January 2, 2023, an announcement appeared on the group's Twitter account, teasing about a new project called "Ladybaby ✕ Heroines" which would be launched on January 8.

Members 
Since developing into a 4-piece, the members have come to have specific roles within the band.
  – vocals (2015–2020), choreography, direction (2018–2020)
  – vocals, rapping, costume design (2018–2020)
  – vocals, harsh vocals, lyrics (2018–2020)
  – vocals (2018–2020)
The CHAOS
"The CHAOS" serves as Ladybaby's backing band in live shows, and in the music video to "Haten ni Raimei".
  – guitar
 Wu-chy – bass guitar
 HAJIMETAL – keyboards
 YOUTH-K!!! – drums

Former members 
 , born on 3 August 1983, withdrew August 1, 2016
 , born on 29 November 2000, withdrew November 17, 2017

Discography

Singles

Promotional singles

Studio albums

Compilation albums

Video albums

Music videos

Notes

Media appearances

TV

Radio

References

Bibliography

External links 
 
 Official page at JPU Records 

Japanese vocal groups
Japanese idol groups
Musical groups established in 2015
Kawaii metal musical groups
2015 establishments in Japan